Following is a list indicating the number of Article III federal judicial appointments made by each president of the United States. The number of judicial offices has risen significantly from the time when Washington's 39 appointments were sufficient to maintain the entire federal judiciary for eight years. As of January 2020, there are 874 authorized Article III judgeships – 9 on the Supreme Court, 179 on the Courts of Appeals, 677 for the district courts including 10 temporary judgeships, and 9 on the United States Court of International Trade.

To date, Ronald Reagan has appointed the largest number of federal judges, with 383, followed closely by Bill Clinton with 378. William Henry Harrison, who died 31 days after his inauguration, is the only president to have appointed no federal judges.

How appointments are counted
In many instances, the number of judgeships appointed is fewer than the number of people appointed as judges, because a president may appoint the same person as a judge to different courts over the course of their presidency. For example, Donald Trump appointed Amy Coney Barrett to the Seventh Circuit, and later appointed her to the Supreme Court. There are also instances in which an individual is appointed to multiple district courts in a single state. For example, Donald Trump appointed John F. Heil III to the Eastern, Northern, and Western Districts of Oklahoma.

In some rare instances, a federal judge resigns their judgeship, and is later reappointed to a federal judgeship – possibly even to the same court – by a different president. A noted example of this is that of Charles Evans Hughes, who resigned from the United States Supreme Court to run for president against Woodrow Wilson, and was later returned to the court as Chief Justice of the United States by Herbert Hoover. Another rare situation occurs where a court that has not been specifically designated as an Article III court is transformed into an Article III court. This occurred in 1958 when the United States Court of Customs and Patent Appeals was changed from an Article I court to an Article III court. In that case, judges who were not initially appointed to an Article III court may become Article III judges without being specifically appointed by the sitting president, or approved by the sitting Senate. However, judges on such bodies have previously been appointed to Article I courts by the president, and those appointments have been approved by the Senate, which must also vote in favor of the legislation that would change the status of such judges. Appointments to Article I courts are not counted in each president's total number of appointments.

The list does not include nominees who were rejected by Congress before having served, but does include the twenty-two recess appointments who were not confirmed by the Senate after having served for some period. The most famous instance of such a post-appointment rejection is that of George Washington's recess appointment of John Rutledge as Chief Justice during a congressional recess in July, 1795. Because of Rutledge's political views and occasional mental illness, the Senate rejected his nomination in December of that year, and Rutledge subsequently attempted suicide and then resigned.

Judicial appointments by president
Because appointees to the short-lived United States Commerce Court were duly appointed as United States circuit judges, they are counted as circuit judges. Those individuals appointed to the United States Court of Customs and Patent Appeals and the United States Court of Claims during the period those courts existed as Article III Courts are counted as circuit judges. Individuals appointed to the United States Customs Court during its existence as an Article III Court and to the United States Court of International Trade are counted as district judges.

Article I appointments
The appointment of Article I judges is more difficult to count, because a large number of positions appointed by the president have quasi-judicial functions. Some Article I judges, however, are clearly designated, such as the judges of the United States Court of Federal Claims, the United States Tax Court, the United States Court of Appeals for the Armed Forces, and the United States Court of Appeals for Veterans Claims. As with Article III judges, the number of Article I appointees that could be characterized as judges increased substantially beginning in the twentieth century.

See also
Judicial appointment history for United States federal courts

Notes

Sources
Federal Judicial Center
United States Courts: Judgeship Appointments by President

Judicial appointments